Ravij (also Romanized as Rāvīj; also known as Rāvīj Chāh Ţāleb) is a village in Dokuheh Rural District, Seh Qaleh District, Sarayan County, South Khorasan Province, Iran. At the 2006 census, its population was 122, in 28 families.

References 

Populated places in Sarayan County